

Description 
Design Tech High School, commonly referred to as d.tech, is a public charter high school in the San Francisco Bay Area. The school is located in Redwood City, California, and is part of the San Mateo Union High School District. Founded in 2014, the school has roughly 562 students (as of Spring 2022) and focuses on implementing technology, self-direction, and the process of design thinking into its curriculum. Since its founding, the school has worked alongside Oracle Education Foundation (OEF) to provide opportunities to students outside of their normal school environment during intersession, a two-week period for vocational and career focused learning that occurs three times per academic year. A second school operated under the same "brand" in Rancho Cordova, California is projected to open in Fall 2023.

History 
The petition that led to the creation of Design Tech was filed with the San Mateo Union High School District (SMUHSD) on September 12, 2013; the SMUHSD Board of Trustees unanimously accepted the petition in November. Design Tech was founded in 2014 by a group of four educators: Nicole Cerra, Ken Montgomery, Christy Knott, and Wendy Little, along with community members Sandra Feder, Ron Drabkin, Betsy Corcoran and David Little. Montgomery, who had previously been the Assistant Principal of Capuchino High School, was inspired by his studies at Stanford, where he attended classes at the Stanford d.school. The group began planning of the school and opened in time for the 2014–2015 school year, with a temporary campus in a hallway at Mills High School in Millbrae, California.

The first class of d.tech graduated in 2018.

The school remained there for the entirety of the year, but students and parents of Mills complained about the school's presence. The next school year, d.tech migrated to a former auto body shop, nearby in an industrial area of Burlingame on Rollins Road. During that school year, d.tech was offered the opportunity to design and build a building on a waterfront plot (at the time a parking lot) of land on the Oracle campus in Redwood City, California. Throughout the year, students and faculty met with Oracle's architectural team to help design the new building, and it was completed in January 2018.

As of 2019, Design Tech offers multiple courses out of the usual high school curriculum, including creative writing, photography, model United Nations, and "design thinking." While the school does not have a standard physical education program, it offers sports such as sailing, basketball, soccer, volleyball, and baseball.

At the start of the 2022-23 school year, Design Tech implemented Yondr Pouches and an e-hall pass system, both of which were highly unpopular with students. A lunchtime protest of the new policies and other suspensions students viewed as unfair resulted, in suspensions and subsequent expulsion hearings for more 13 students. The school and its administration have been criticized for their handling of the situation.

Campus

Mills High School
Design Tech's first campus was at Mills High School in Millbrae, California. In spring 2014 SMUHSD offered six  classrooms at Mills essentially rent-free, based on the requirements of Proposition 39, which mandates that charter schools be offered facilities "reasonably equivalent" to public schools. School leaders had initially requested space at Burlingame High School, but district officials opined that there was no space available at BHS. Intended to be a temporary campus, d.tech was located within a single hallway at Mills. In the first two weeks of school at the Mills campus, instead of attending academic classes, students were tasked with designing their classroom layouts. They were also required to take a field trip on the second day of school due to Mills' first day of school. However, students and parents of Mills complained about the presence of d.tech on their campus, capped by a contentious SMUHSD Board of Trustees meeting where State Senator Jerry Hill declared he would ask a civil grand jury to investigate the Board's responsiveness to citizens, and d.tech began planning their relocation within a few months.

Rollins Road
Design Tech began to rent a large warehouse, previously an auto-body repair school, to use as their campus. It was located in Millbrae as well, on Rollins Road, adjacent to US Highway 101. The students began to affectionately call this campus "Rollins", after the road it was located on. The main area of the building was the "Hangar"; a large, open, concrete-floored space. Classrooms in the Hangar were fluid; while some students often complained about distracting noise during their classes, as there were no walls or doors to stop sound or people from entering classrooms, other students felt that there was a special sense of community in this open space that brought them all closer together and could not be replicated in another way. The Rollins Road campus included the school's first iteration of the Design Realization Garage which students used to build projects such as wheelchair-accessible ramps, skateboard racks, and a hexagonal bench that was eventually used as seating for meetings and snack breaks. Despite the limited space of the campus and its lack of school-related uses, students were quick to use the often empty parking lot for basketball, football, and other physical activities.

Oracle
Soon after d.tech's move to Rollins, the Oracle Education Foundation announced plans to build a $43 million, 64,000 sq ft (5946 m2) campus for d.tech on an parking lot adjacent to the Belmont Slough. They agreed to lease the building to d.tech for $1 per year, symbolic of the goal of having a strong relationship with the school. The building was designed to make space for a large, two-story, 8,000 square foot Design Realization Garage, or DRG, where students could work on projects during free time or during various classes held in the DRG, with the first floor housing machinery including a Bridgeport Knee Mill, Table Saw, Band Saw, CNC Router, among others. The upstairs DRG houses two laser cutters, a wide format printer, and various other resources available to students. During the first year on campus, students moved to increase happiness on campus by installing two vending machines with snacks. This project by students spanned over the course of almost 3 years, with eventual support from staff after sorting out minor details.

Awards and recognition 
The current Design Tech High School campus building at Oracle has won the Green Building Award from Sustainable San Mateo County  and Best Education Project from both Silicon Valley Business Journal and PCBS as a part of their 2018 Gold Nugget Awards. It is also LEED-certified. The school is WASC accredited. The facility is also USGBC LEED Gold Certified, and utilizes reclaimed water to flush toilets and urinals, as well as utilizing low-flow faucets with aerators to help with environmental sustainability.

Athletics 
Design Tech offers students the chance to create sports teams based on interest. The first sport introduced to the school was Basketball during the school's inaugural year. Since the inaugural year, the school has expanded to six sports for both Boys and Girls consisting of girls volleyball, cross country, basketball, soccer, boys baseball, girls softball, swimming, track, and sailing. In the 2019–2020 school year, girls volleyball, cross country, and boys basketball have qualified for the CCS playoffs.

Robotics 
The Design Tech High School FRC team, 5940 BREAD (Breakthrough Robotics Engineering And Design), was founded in the 2015-2016 FIRST season.

The team went to the World Championships in their first season via the Rookie All-Star award. In the 2021-2022 season the team won the Monterey Bay Regional qualifying them to compete at the World Championships in Houston, Texas. Team 5940 ranked 3rd, winning the Roebling Division at the World Championship qualifying them for the Einstein rounds where they went 1-4-0. Additionally, they won the entrepreneurship award for an outstanding business plan and organizational structure.

Admissions 

Design Tech applicants are admitted to the school based on a lottery system, per California law. The lottery gives preference to siblings and to students in the San Mateo and Sequoia High School districts. There are more applicants than there are spaces available, and the school has moved to offer tours only after admission has been granted due to the large number of applicants.

Executive directors 
2014–present: Ken Montgomery

Enrollment 

N.B.: Non-binary student data not available prior to the 2021-22 school year.

Controversy 
Upon the move to the Oracle campus, d.tech received criticism from news outlets including the HuffPost, who claimed that white and Asian students were overrepresented when compared to other schools in the same district.

The school additionally drew criticism from parents and neighboring schools for their handling of student protests in late 2022. Showing the abuse of power by the admin

References

External links 
 

Charter schools in California
High schools in San Mateo County, California
Educational institutions established in 2014
2014 establishments in California